Demethylmenaquinone methyltransferase (S-adenosyl-L-methionine-DMK methyltransferase, demethylmenaquinone C-methylase, 2-heptaprenyl-1,4-naphthoquinone methyltransferase, 2-demethylmenaquinone methyltransferase, S-adenosyl-L-methionine:2-demethylmenaquinone methyltransferase) is an enzyme with systematic name S-adenosyl-L-methionine:demethylmenaquinone methyltransferase. This enzyme catalyses the following chemical reaction

 demethylmenaquinol + S-adenosyl-L-methionine  menaquinol + S-adenosyl-L-homocysteine

The enzyme catalyses the last step in menaquinone biosynthesis.

References

External links 
 

EC 2.1.1